Thales of Miletus was a Greek philosopher from Miletus.

Thales may also refer to:

People
 Thaletas or "Thales of Crete", an early Greek musician and poet
 Thales (painter), an ancient Greek painter from Sicyon 
 Thales Leites Lourenço, a Brazilian mixed martial artist
 Thales (footballer, born 1994), full name Thales Bento Oleques, Brazilian football fullback
 Thales Paula (born 2001), Brazilian football midfielder

Geography
 6001 Thales, a main-belt asteroid
 Thales (crater), a crater on the Moon

Business
 Thales Academy, a network of private schools in North Carolina

 Thales Group, a France-based engineering and electronics company with various divisions: 
 Thales Air Defence
 Thales Alenia Space
 Thales Australia
 Thales Communications
 Thales Navigation
 Thales Nederland
 Thales Optronics
 Thales Rail Signalling Solutions
 Thales Spectra
 Thales Training & Simulation
 Thales Underwater Systems

Other
 Thales, Indiana, an unincorporated community in Dubois County
 Thales' theorem, a theorem used in geometry 
 Thales' theorem, (not to be confused with the above) usually referred to as the Intercept theorem

See also 

 Thale (disambiguation)
 Thalys